All My Friends Are Here is a studio album by Turkish-American record producer, arranger, and composer Arif Mardin, released on June 15, 2010. It is the album that Arif Mardin referred to as his life's work, featuring performances by artists whom he produced over the years of his career, including Bette Midler, Chaka Khan, David Sanborn, Norah Jones, Carly Simon, Phil Collins among them.

Whereas Arif Mardin's first two albums were instrumental, All My Friends Are Here is an album of his songs.  Arif Mardin was a film buff and wrote collages for each song. In the trailer for The Greatest Ears in Town: The Arif Mardin Story, Arif Mardin said the songs were visual, film music in his mind.

Recording sessions of All My Friends Are Here were filmed for the companion documentary The Greatest Ears in Town: The Arif Mardin Story.

Recording
Recording sessions took place in New York from 2005 to 2006, starting with "So Blue". In producing Chaka Khan's vocal, Khan said "He showed me what it was really like to sing jazz."

Soundtrack

References

External links
 The Greatest Ears in Town: The Arif Mardin Story (EPK) on YouTube
 So Blue on YouTube
The Greatest Ears in Town (song) on YouTube

Albums produced by Arif Mardin
2010 albums